Lepidochrysops mashuna, the mashuna blue, is a butterfly in the family Lycaenidae. It is found in Zimbabwe. Their habitat consists of grassy areas in savanna. Adults feed from flowers. They are on wing from October to December.

References

Butterflies described in 1894
Lepidochrysops
Endemic fauna of Zimbabwe
Butterflies of Africa